David Dhawan (born Rajinder Dhawan; 16 August 1951) is an Indian director of Hindi films. A member of the Dhawan family, he has directed over 42 films. The 1993 action thriller Aankhen and 1999 comedy Biwi No.1 earned him two Filmfare Award for Best Director nominations. His notable works include Swarg (1990), Shola Aur Shabnam (1992), Bol Radha Bol (1992), Raja Babu (1994), Coolie No.1 (1995), Saajan Chale Sasural (1996), Judwaa (1997), Hero No. 1 (1997), Deewana Mastana (1997), Bade Miyan Chote Miyan (1998), Haseena Maan Jaayegi (1999), Dulhan Hum Le Jayenge (2000), Jodi No.1 (2001), Mujhse Shaadi Karogi (2004), Partner (2007), Chashme Baddoor (2013), Main Tera Hero (2014) and Judwaa 2 (2017).

Personal life
David Dhawan was born on 16 August 1951 as Rajinder Dhawan in Agartala, Tripura in a Punjabi family. His father, a manager in UCO Bank, got transferred to Kanpur, Uttar Pradesh. He studied in Christ Church Inter College and BNSD Inter College until Class XII, and then joined FTII for acting where he changed his name to David Dhawan, a name given by his Jewish neighbours in Agartala. Seeing other actors like Satish Shah and Suresh Oberoi, Dhawan realised that he cannot act. So he took up editing as an option. He became a fan of Manmohan Desai and Hrishikesh Mukherjee. Watching the Bengali film Meghe Dhaka Tara, directed by Ritwik Ghatak, made him interested in filmmaking and passed with a gold medal. Dhawan has two brothers, actor Anil Ashok.

Dhawan is married to Karuna Chopra, with whom he has two sons, Rohit Dhawan and Varun Dhawan. His brother is actor Anil Dhawan and nephew is actor Siddharth Dhawan.

Career
Dhawan started off as an editor in Saaransh in 1984 before moving into directing. He specialises in directing comedy films. His 1993 film Ankhen, starring Govinda, Chunky Pandey and Kader Khan, was highly successful at the box office. Another successful film was Shola Aur Shabnam. His 2007 film Partner was successful.

Dhawan is on the board of Asian Academy of Film & Television and Asian School of Media Studies where he has been honoured with an academy award by Sandeep Marwah. He was a judge on the Star Plus show Nach Baliye 3 in 2008 and on the show Hans Baliye.

Work with Govinda
Dhawan first teamed with actor Govinda for the film Taaqatwar (1989). He then formed a collaboration with Govinda and directed 18 films with him as the leading actor, including Taaqatwar (1989), Swarg (1990), Shola Aur Shabnam (1992), Aankhen (1993), Raja Babu (1994), Coolie No. 1 (1995), Saajan Chale Sasural (1996), Banarasi Babu (1997), Deewana Mastana (1997), Hero No. 1 (1997), Bade Miyan Chote Miyan (1998), Haseena Maan Jaayegi (1999), Kunwara (2000), Jodi No.1 (2001), Kyo Kii... Main Jhuth Nahin Bolta (2001), Ek Aur Ek Gyarah (2003), Partner (2007) and Do Knot Disturb (2009).  Partner, which co-starred Salman Khan, grossed Rs. 300 Million in India on its opening week, the second highest domestic opening week gross for an Indian film at that time. The same year, Salman Khan invited Dhawan and Govinda on his show 10 Ka Dum to celebrate Partner.  Dhawan got back to the trio of Govinda, Ritesh Deshmukh and himself with the film, Do Knot Disturb.

Filmography

Awards and nominations

References

External links

1951 births
Living people
Film directors from Tripura
Film and Television Institute of India alumni
Hindi-language film directors
Hindi film editors
People from Agartala
People from Kanpur
20th-century Indian film directors
21st-century Indian film directors
Film editors from Tripura
Punjabi people